Milan Damnjanović (Serbian Cyrillic: Милан Дамњановић) (born 07.09.1953.) is a full professor specialising in Quantum mechanics and Mathematical physics at the Faculty of Physics at the University of Belgrade and Member of Serbian Academy of Sciences and Arts.

External links 
University of Belgrade
Faculty of Physics, University of Belgrade
Milan Damnjanović's personal webpage

Books 
Symmetry in Quantum Nonrelativistic Physics
ELEMENTI DIFERENCIJALNE GEOMETRIJE I OPŠTE TEORIJE RELATIVNOSTI - in Serbian
O SIMETRIJI U KVANTNOJ NERELATIVISTIČKOJ FIZICI - in Serbian

Serbian physicists
Academic staff of the University of Belgrade
Members of the Serbian Academy of Sciences and Arts
1953 births
Living people